Peddathippasamudram (P.T.M.) is a village in Annamayya district of the Indian state of Andhra Pradesh. It is the mandal headquarters of Peddathippasamudram mandal.

References 

Villages in Annamayya district
Mandal headquarters in Annamayya district